Komsomolsky (masculine), Komsomolskoye (neuter), or Komsomolskaya (feminine) may refer to:

Divisions
Komsomolsky District, several districts in the countries of the former Soviet Union
Komsomolskoye Urban Settlement, several municipal urban settlements in Russia
Komsomolskoye Microdistrict, a part of the city of Kaliningrad, Russia

Populated places
Komsomolsky, Russia (Komsomolskaya, Komsomolskoye), several inhabited localities in Russia
Komsomolskyi (Komsomolsky), an urban-type settlement in Ukraine
Komsomolske, Donetsk Oblast (Komsomolskoye), a town in Donetsk Oblast, Ukraine

Metro stations
Komsomolskaya (Koltsevaya Line), a station of the Moscow Metro, Moscow, Russia
Komsomolskaya (Sokolnicheskaya Line), a station of the Moscow Metro, Moscow, Russia
Komsomolskaya (Nizhny Novgorod Metro), a station of the Nizhny Novgorod Metro, Nizhny Novgorod, Russia
Komsomolskaya (Volgograd Metrotram), a station of the Volgograd Metrotram, Volgograd, Russia
Komsomolskaya, former name of Devyatkino, a station of the St. Petersburg Metro, Russia
Komsomolska (Komsomolskaya), former name of Palats Sportu, a station of the Kharkiv Metro, Kharkiv, Ukraine
Komsomolska (Komsomolskaya), former name of Chernihivska, a station of the Kyiv Metro, Kyiv, Ukraine
Komsomolskaya, former name of Milliy Bog, a station of the Tashkent Metro, Tashkent, Uzbekistan

Other
Komsomolskaya Square (Moscow), a square in central Moscow, Russia
Komsomolskaya (Antarctic research station), a former Soviet research station in the Australian Antarctic Territory

See also
Komsomol (disambiguation)
Komsomolets (disambiguation)
Komsomolsk (disambiguation)